The Miami Marlins are an American professional baseball team based in Miami. The Marlins compete in Major League Baseball (MLB) as a member club of the National League (NL) East division. The club's home ballpark is LoanDepot Park.

The franchise began play as an expansion team in the 1993 season as the Florida Marlins. The Marlins originally played home games at Joe Robbie Stadium, which they shared with the National Football League (NFL)'s Miami Dolphins. In 2012, the team moved to LoanDepot Park (then known as Marlins Park), their first exclusive home and the first to be designed as a baseball park. As part of an agreement with park owner Miami-Dade County to use the stadium, the franchise also changed their name to the Miami Marlins prior to the 2012 season.

The Marlins have qualified for the postseason only three times, but won the World Series during their first two runs in 1997 and 2003. All three of their playoff appearances came as wild card teams, making them one of two MLB franchises (along with the Colorado Rockies) to have never won a division title, as well as the only franchise to have never appeared in back-to-back postseasons. The Marlins were also the first team to win the World Series as a wild card.

Franchise history

Wayne Huizenga, CEO of Blockbuster Entertainment Corporation, was awarded an expansion franchise in the National League (NL) for a $95 million expansion fee and the team began operations in 1993 as the Florida Marlins. MLB had announced a few months earlier that it intended to add two new teams to the National League. It was a foregone conclusion that one of them would be placed in Florida; the only question was whether Huizenga would beat out competing groups from Orlando and Tampa Bay. Orlando fielded a very spirited campaign bolstered by its family-oriented tourism industry. Tampa Bay already had a baseball park—the Florida Suncoast Dome in St. Petersburg, completed in 1990. However, on June 10, the National League awarded a Miami-based franchise to Huizenga. The franchise adopted the nickname "Marlins" from previous minor league teams, the Miami Marlins of the Triple-A 's International League from 1956 to 1960, and the Miami Marlins (1962–70) and Miami Marlins (1982–88) teams that played in the Florida State League.

The Marlins' first manager was Rene Lachemann, a former catcher who had previously managed the Seattle Mariners and Milwaukee Brewers, and who at the time of his hiring was a third base coach for the Oakland Athletics. The team drafted its initial lineup of players in the 1992 MLB Expansion Draft. The Marlins defeated the Houston Astros 12–8 in their inaugural spring training game. Jeff Conine hit Florida's first homer before a crowd of 6,696 at the Cocoa Expo Sports Complex. The Marlins won their first game on April 5, against the Dodgers. Charlie Hough was the starting pitcher for that game. Jeff Conine went 4-for-4 as well, making him an immediate crowd favorite. By the end of his tenure with Florida, he had earned the nickname "Mr. Marlin." Gary Sheffield and Bryan Harvey represented the Marlins as the club's first All-Star Game selections, and Sheffield homered in the Marlins' first All-Star Game at-bat. The team finished the year five games ahead of the last-place New York Mets and with an attendance of 3,064,847. In that season, the Marlins traded young set-up reliever Trevor Hoffman and two minor-league prospects to the San Diego Padres for third baseman Gary Sheffield. While Sheffield helped Florida immediately and became an all-star, Hoffman eventually emerged as the best closer in the National League. After the 1993 season, Donald A. Smiley was named the second president in club history.

1997: First World Series title 
Following an 80–82 record in 1996, former Pittsburgh Pirates manager Jim Leyland was hired to lead the club heading into 1997.

In 1997, the Marlins finished nine games back of the Division Champion Atlanta Braves, but earned the wild card berth. Veteran additions such as LF Moisés Alou, 3B Bobby Bonilla, and trade-deadline additions Darren Daulton and Jim Eisenreich added experience and clutch hits. Talented young stars Luis Castillo (2B) and Édgar Rentería (SS) comprised one of the best double play combos in the NL. The Marlins swept the San Francisco Giants 3–0 in the National League Division Series, and then went on to beat the Atlanta Braves 4–2 in the National League Championship Series, overcoming the loss of Alex Fernandez to a torn rotator cuff, and Kevin Brown to a virus. Brown's place was taken in Game 5 by rookie pitcher Liván Hernández, who struck out 15 Braves and outdueled multiple Cy Young Award winner Greg Maddux to a 2–1 victory. The underdog Marlins went on to face the Cleveland Indians in the 1997 World Series, and won in seven games. In Game 7, Craig Counsell's sacrifice fly in the bottom of the ninth tied the game at 2, then, with the bases loaded and two outs in the bottom of the 11th, Édgar Rentería's soft liner glanced off the glove of Cleveland pitcher Charles Nagy and into center field to score Counsell and give the Marlins the win.

2003: Second World Series victory 

On May 9, the Marlins called up high-kicking southpaw Dontrelle Willis from the Double-A Carolina Mudcats and helped carry the injury-plagued Marlins with an 11–2 record in his first 17 starts. Miguel Cabrera (also from the Mudcats) filled in well, hitting a walk-off home run in his first major league game, against the Tampa Bay Devil Rays at Pro Player Stadium. Both Willis and Cabrera would later prove to be essential parts of the Marlin's playoff success. Jeff Conine – an original Marlin and member of the 1997 World Series team – returned from Baltimore, Hall of Fame catcher Iván Rodríguez signed with the Marlins as a free agent and closer Ugueth Urbina arrived from the Texas Rangers. These acquisitions helped to keep the team in contention, and although they finished ten games behind the Braves, the Marlins captured the NL wild card.

On October 15, the Marlins defeated the Chicago Cubs four games to three in the 2003 National League Championship Series, coming back from a 3–1 deficit. Game 6 saw the Marlins play a role in one of baseball's most infamous moments, the Steve Bartman incident. With one out in the eighth inning and the Cubs three runs ahead, Marlins second baseman Luis Castillo hit a pop foul a row into the stands along the third baseline. Cubs fan Steve Bartman reached for the ball, preventing Cubs leftfielder Moisés Alou from making the out and setting off an eight-run Marlins rally. The incident with Bartman and a come-from-behind win in Wrigley Field in Game 7 helped the Marlins capture their second NL pennant, keeping the "Curse of the Billy Goat" alive and well.

In the 2003 World Series, the Marlins defeated the heavily favored New York Yankees in six games, winning the sixth game in Yankee Stadium. Shortstop Álex González helped the Marlins in Game 4 of the series with a walk-off home run in extra innings. Josh Beckett was named the Most Valuable Player for the series after twirling a five-hit complete-game shutout in Game 6. Skipper Jack McKeon became the oldest manager ever to win a World Series title.

2012–present 
In 2012, the team moved from the football-oriented Sun Life Stadium (located in Miami Gardens) to Marlins Park in downtown Miami. As a condition of the move, the team was renamed the Miami Marlins, and adopted a new logo and colors. On November 16, 2017, Giancarlo Stanton won the National League MVP, becoming the first Marlin to win the award.

During the 2020 shortened season, the Marlins finished with a 31–29 overall record and 2nd place in the NL East. In the Wild Card Series they swept the Chicago Cubs in 2 games. Miami loss in three games to the Atlanta Braves in the NLDS.

On November 13, 2020, the Marlins became the first club in any American major-level sports league to hire a woman to an executive position when Kim Ng was announced as the team's general manager. In addition, she will also be MLB's first Asian American general manager. On February 28, 2022, it was announced Derek Jeter stepped down as CEO of the Marlins.

Uniform history

1993–2002

The Florida Marlins debuted wearing three different uniforms. The primary and alternate home uniforms shared the same design: "Marlins" (with an underline after the letter "S") in teal with black trim and letters were rendered in black with teal trim, along with teal pinstripes. The alternate home uniforms were sleeveless, and teal undershirts were added to the ensemble. The road uniforms featured "Florida" (with the marlin wrapped around the letter "F") in teal with black trim and letters were rendered in black with teal trim. The primary logo patch was placed on the left sleeve. The Marlins wore three different cap designs, all featuring the "F" insignia in front of a leaping marlin. The all-teal home cap and the black-brimmed teal road cap were initially the primary headwear the team used, with the all-black cap as the alternate.

By the late 1990s, teal was gradually de-emphasized and the Marlins wore black caps and undershirts for the remainder of the uniform's run.

2003–2011
The Marlins introduced new uniforms before its second World Series-winning season. On the home uniforms, teal was relegated to accent color status with black now the primary lettering and pinstripe color. Silver accents were also added to the letters. A sleeved alternate pinstriped home uniform replaced the original sleeveless version, sharing the same design as the primary home uniform except with the "F" logo on the left chest. The "F" logo also took its place on the left sleeve in place of the primary logo. Road uniforms again featured "Florida" but now shared the same script look and color scheme as the home uniform (with an underline after the letter "A"). White accents were added to the letters. In addition, the Marlins began wearing a black alternate uniform, featuring the same "Marlins" script but in silver with teal, black and white accents. Both alternate uniforms lacked the front chest numbers.

In 2010, the Marlins changed its road uniform design, replacing "Florida" with "Marlins". The sleeve logo patches were also removed.

2012–2018

Rebranding into the Miami Marlins, the team introduced a new color scheme, with orange, black and blue. The "M" insignia is white with orange, yellow and sky blue accents, along with a stylized abstract marlin on top. This logo served as a cap logo as well as a patch on the left sleeve. The primary home, road and black alternate uniforms all feature "Miami" in front, with the first "M" shaped similarly to the cap and sleeve logos. The home and road uniform feature black letters with silver trim, along with orange drop shadows on the numbers, while the alternate black uniform feature white letters with silver trim and orange numbers with silver trim and black drop shadows. The orange alternate uniform featured the team name in white with sky blue accents; however the abstract marlin was located atop the letter "I". Letters were black with silver trim, while sky blue drop shadows were featured on the numbers. The Marlins primarily wore all-black caps, though for a brief period they wore alternate all-orange caps.

2019–present
The Marlins released updated logos and color schemes, replacing orange and silver with bright Caliente red, Miami blue and slate grey. Home and road uniforms contain 'Miami" and letters in black with red drop shadows and blue accents, while the black alternate uniform contain "Marlins" and letters in black with red drop shadows and blue accents. The cap logo, used on the all-black cap, is a stylized "M" with a more realistic marlin on top. The marlin logo also appears on the left sleeve.

World Series championships
The Marlins won the World Series in 1997 and 2003, but both titles were followed by controversial periods where the team sold off all the high-priced players and rebuilt. Between 2003 and 2019, the team's two World Series runs also marked their sole postseason appearances. Their three playoff qualifications and seven winning seasons are the fewest among MLB franchises.

Despite never winning a division title, the Florida Marlins is the only team to make the playoffs and win a World Series in its first two winning seasons.

Roster

All-time roster

Opening Day starting pitchers

Opening Day lineups

Achievements

Awards

 No-Hitters: Marlins pitchers have pitched six no-hitters in team regular-season history, five coming against teams in the NL West and one against a team from the American League (AL).

 Hitting for the cycle: No Marlins player has ever hit for the cycle in franchise history.

Retired numbers

From 1993 until 2011, the Marlins had retired the number 5 in honor of Carl Barger, the first president of the Florida Marlins, who had died prior to the team's inaugural season. Barger's favorite player was Joe DiMaggio, thus the selection of number 5. With the move to LoanDepot Park, the team opted to honor Barger with a plaque instead, and opened number 5 to circulation. Logan Morrison, a Kansas City native and fan of Royals Hall-of-Famer George Brett (who wore that number with the Royals), became the first Marlins player to wear the number. As of 2023, the Marlins are the only franchise with no retired numbers for former players.

After José Fernández's death as a result of a boating accident on September 25, 2016, the Miami Marlins announced plans to build a memorial at LoanDepot Park in his honor. However, Fernández's number 16 has yet to be officially retired.

Baseball Hall of Famers

Ford C. Frick Award recipients

Florida Sports Hall of Fame

Minor league affiliations

The Miami Marlins farm system consists of six minor league affiliates.

Radio and television

The Marlins' flagship radio station from their inception in 1993 through 2007 was WQAM 560 AM. Although the Marlins had plans to leave WQAM after 2006, they remained with WQAM for the 2007 season. On October 11, 2007,  the Marlins announced an agreement with WAXY 790 AM to broadcast all games for the 2008 season. Longtime Montreal Expo and current Marlins play-by-play radio announcer Dave Van Horne won the Hall of Fame's Ford C. Frick Award for excellence in baseball broadcasting in 2010. He shares the play-by-play duties with Glenn Geffner.

Games are also broadcast in Spanish on Radio Mambi 710 AM. Felo Ramírez called play-by-play on that station from 1993 to 2017 along with Luis Quintana, won the Ford C. Frick Award from the National Baseball Hall of Fame in 2001.

Marlins games are televised by Bally Sports Florida. Paul Severino serves as the play-by-play announcer with Tommy Hutton, J.P. Arencibia, Gaby Sánchez and Jeff Nelson. Jessica Blaylock host's Marlins Live and is the Marlins on site reporter.

Culture

In 1989, Back to the Future Part II had a reference to the Chicago Cubs defeating a baseball team from Miami in the 2015 World Series, ending the longest championship drought in all four of the major North American professional sports leagues. In actuality, the Cubs would end up getting swept in four games by the New York Mets in the NLCS, the Marlins failed to make the postseason, and the 2015 World Series was between the Kansas City Royals and the New York Mets, with the Royals winning in five games. Also, both the Cubs and Marlins are part of the National League, rendering a World Series matchup between the two teams impossible.

The Marlins were the first team in Major League Baseball to have a dance/cheer team. Debuting in 2003, the "Marlins Mermaids" influenced other MLB teams to develop their own cheer/dance squads; this was inspired in part by similar squads from the NFL and NBA. In 2008, the Florida Marlins debuted "The Marlins Manatees", Major League Baseball's first all-male dance/energy squad, to star alongside the Mermaids. As of 2012, the Marlins have abandoned the "Mermaids" and "Manatees" for in-game entertainment instead using an "energy squad", a co-ed group of dancers. In 2019, the Marlins brought back the Mermaids for the first time since 2012.

The Marlins have had many official anthems over the years, performed by such artists as Pitbull, DJ Khaled, Poo Bear and Creed frontman Scott Stapp. Stapp penned their 2010 anthem Marlins Will Soar.

On July 16, 2022, the Marlins became the second NL team to form a cheering section for fans when it opened "Sandy's Beach" at Section 22 of LoanDepot Park for supporters of team starter Sandy Alcantara. Fans assigned to this section, located near the 3rd base line, wear beach related clothing in an nod to the city's famous beaches whenever Sandy pitchers on select game days.

Finishes

Best finishes in franchise history

The following are the five best seasons in Marlins history:

Worst finishes in franchise history
The following are the five worst seasons in Marlins' history:

Home attendance
Other than their first few years as a franchise in the 1990s, the Marlins have consistently ranked as one of lowest attendance teams in the league, coming in last place (30th) several of the past 20 years. Even when LoanDepot Park was completed for the 2012 season, attendance was only average for the first year, dropping down to second to last by 2013.

Finance

Opening Day salaries
Opening Day payrolls for 25-man roster (since 1993):

Annual financial records
The annual financial records of the Marlins according to Forbes since 2001.

References

External links

 
 Baseball-Reference.com

 

 
1993 establishments in Florida
Grapefruit League
Major League Baseball teams
Professional baseball teams in Florida
Baseball teams established in 1993
Baseball teams in Miami